This is a list of reptiles of Massachusetts. It includes all reptiles currently found in the US state of Massachusetts. It does not include species found only in captivity.

Snakes

Turtles

Lizards

References
Massachusetts Reptiles and Amphibians List J.E. Cardoza and P.G. Mirick, Massachusetts Div. of Fisheries and Wildlife
Red-eared Slider Fact Sheet-USGS

Massachusetts
Reptiles